Abdoul Moumouni Amadou Darankoum (born 7 August 2002) is a Nigerien professional footballer who plays as a defensive midfielder for Sheriff Tiraspol.

Club career
Moumouni started his career with Nigerien club US GN in 2018. On 16 September 2021, he signed for Moldovan National Division club Sheriff Tiraspol.

International career
On 22 September 2019, he made his debut for the Niger national team in an African Nations Championship qualification match against the Ivory Coast.

Career statistics

International

References

External links

2002 births
Living people
Association football midfielders
Nigerien footballers
Niger international footballers
US GN players
Super Ligue (Niger) players
FC Sheriff Tiraspol players
Moldovan Super Liga players
Nigerien expatriate footballers
Expatriate footballers in Moldova
Nigerien expatriate sportspeople in Moldova
Niger A' international footballers
2020 African Nations Championship players